Enclosed Ideographic Supplement is a Unicode block containing forms of characters and words from Chinese, Japanese and Korean enclosed within or stylised as squares, brackets, or circles. It contains three such characters containing one or more kana, and many containing CJK ideographs. Many of its characters were added for compatibility with the Japanese ARIB STD-B24 standard. Six symbols from Chinese folk religion were added in Unicode version 10.

Block

Emoji
The Enclosed Ideographic Supplement block contains fifteen emoji:
U+1F201–U+1F202, U+1F21A, U+1F22F, U+1F232–U+1F23A and U+1F250–U+1F251.

The block has eight standardized variants defined to specify emoji-style (U+FE0F VS16) or text presentation (U+FE0E VS15) for the
following four base characters: U+1F202, U+1F21A, U+1F22F and U+1F237.

History
The following Unicode-related documents record the purpose and process of defining specific characters in the Enclosed Ideographic Supplement block:

See also 

 CJK Unified Ideographs
 Hiragana (Unicode block)
 Katakana (Unicode block)

References 

Ideographic Supplement, Enclosed